Tara Lynn Osseck was Miss Missouri 2009.  Before being named Miss Missouri 2009, she was Miss Lake of the Ozarks 2009.  Osseck is a tap dancer and her platform is "Education and Awareness of Eating Disorders".

Osseck is a 2004 graduate of Duchesne High School in St. Charles, Missouri.  She then went on to attend Truman State University where she graduated in 2007.  She earned a master's degree in health administration from the University of Memphis.

Osseck competed in the Miss America 2010 pageant broadcast live on TLC from the Theatre for the Performing Arts at the Planet Hollywood Resort and Casino on January 30, 2010. She did not make the Final 15.

As of 2011, Osseck was employed by St. Luke's Hospital in St. Louis, as a member of the hospital's Physician Relations Staff. In 2015, she was a St. Louis Business Journal "30 Under 30" award honoree as the hospital's manager of physician relations and business development.

References

External links
 
Miss Missouri official website
Miss Missouri 2009 Tara Osseck Blog
Miss Lake of the Ozarks website

Living people
Miss America 2010 delegates
American beauty pageant winners
People from St. Charles, Missouri
Truman State University alumni
University of Memphis alumni
1986 births